The southern broad-footed mole (Scapanus occultus) is a species of mammal in the family Talpidae. It is found only in the U.S. state of California and northernmost Baja California in Mexico.

Taxonomy 
It was formerly considered a subspecies of the northern broad-footed mole (S. latimanus), with the combined species being known as the broad-footed mole, but a 2021 study found sufficient anatomical and genetic divergence to split both as distinct species. The Mexican mole (S. anthonyi) was formerly thought to be a subspecies of the broad-footed mole but is now also considered a distinct species.

Distribution 
It ranges from the throughout the southern Sierra Nevada and most of southern California from San Luis Obispo south to the U.S.-Mexico border, and along the Peninsular Ranges into northernmost Baja California. In the two areas where S. occultus and S. latimanus are sympatric (a portion of the southern Sierra Nevada and the northern portion of Santa Barbara), S. occultus inhabits lower altitudes and S. latimanus inhabits higher ones.

Description 
S. occultus is overall smaller in body size than S. latimanus, and has a longer and wider skull.

References 

Scapanus
Mammals of the United States
Mammals of Mexico
Fauna of the Baja California Peninsula
Mammals described in 1912
Taxa named by Joseph Grinnell